Anelaphus mutatus is a species of beetle in the family Cerambycidae. It was described by Gahan in 1890.

References

Anelaphus
Beetles described in 1890